Central Toronto Youth Services (CTYS) is an accredited children's mental health centre serving youth throughout the Toronto Region. CTYS serves at-risk youth aged 12 to 24, focusing on meeting the needs of the hardest to serve young people. Funding comes from the Province of Ontario, the Ministry of Children and Youth Services, and the Ministry of Health and Long Term Care, as such, all CTYS services are free of charge.

CTYS operates one office downtown Toronto, located at 65 Wellesley Street East, Suite 300.

History
In 1973 CTYS was incorporated and licensed as a Children's Mental Health Centre.

In 1987 the Sexual Orientation and Youth Program (SOYP) of CTYS gained core-funding from MCSS, a unique status as the only core-funded program for lesbian, gay and bisexual youth in Canada. It later joined with the AIDS Committee of Toronto and Positive Youth Outreach to form the first campaign in Canada specifically targeting youth with AIDS or HIV.

In 2007 CTYS was honoured at the City of Toronto Access, Equity and Human Rights Awards ceremony as recipients of the Pride Award for their work with gay, lesbian, bisexual and transgender Youth.

Leadership

Board of Directors

Central Toronto Youth Services is led by a nine-member volunteer Board. Margaret Leitenberger, the retired Director of the Children's Aid Society of Toronto's Toronto Branch, is the Chair of the Board. Other Board Directors include Dr. Ned McKeown, James LeNoury, Peter Chaban, Mary Murphy, Magda Zecevic, David Fung, Josh Bohnen, and Brian O'Connor.

Director Team
Heather Sproule, MSW, is the executive director of CTYS. She joined Central Toronto Youth Services in April 2007. Over the past 17 years she has served as the Founding Executive Director of Kids Help Phone, the National Executive Director of Boys & Girls Clubs of Canada and the first President of Big Brothers and Big Sisters of Toronto. She leads a Director team which includes Dr. Fred Mathews, Director of Programs and Research, and Joan Marshall, BA, CGA, Director of Administration and Human Resources.

Publications
Options: Control Problems and Alternatives to Section 8, 1975
Priorities: The Effects of Funding Structures on Services to Adolescents In Ontario - A Proposal for Re-allocation of Resources, December 1976
 Youth, Opportunity, Action, 1982
Mirror to the Night: A Psycho-Social Study of Adolescent Prostitution, 1986
Often Invisible: Counselling Gay and Lesbian Youth, 1988 
Pride and Prejudice: The life and times of gay and lesbian youth, 1992 
 Updated as Pride and Prejudice: Working with Lesbian, Gay and Bisexual Youth, 1997
No Safe Bed: lesbian and gay youth in residential services, 1993
Opening Doors: Counseling lesbian and gay youth, 1994

References

External links
The Official Website of CTYS
Children's Mental Health Ontario

Charities based in Canada
Mental health organizations in Canada
Organizations based in Toronto
Organizations established in 1973